MCRD may refer to:

Marine Corps Recruit Depot Parris Island, South Carolina, United States
Marine Corps Recruit Depot San Diego, California, United States
MCRD San Diego Command Museum